The 2018 RBC Pro Challenge was a professional tennis tournament played on outdoor hard courts. It was the second edition of the tournament and was part of the 2018 ITF Women's Circuit. It took place in Tyler, United States, on 29 October–4 November 2018.

Singles main draw entrants

Seeds 

 1 Rankings as of 22 October 2018.

Other entrants 
The following players received a wildcard into the singles main draw:
  Sophie Chang
  Louisa Chirico
  Christina McHale
  Caty McNally

The following player received entry using a protected ranking:
  Elizabeth Halbauer
  Nadia Podoroska

The following player received entry using a junior exempt:
  Whitney Osuigwe

The following players received entry from the qualifying draw:
  Ellie Douglas
  Quinn Gleason
  Ann Li
  Bianca Turati

Champions

Singles

 Whitney Osuigwe def.  Beatriz Haddad Maia, 6–3, 6–4

Doubles

 Nicole Gibbs /  Asia Muhammad def.  Desirae Krawczyk /  Giuliana Olmos, 3–6, 6–3, [14–12]

External links 
 2018 RBC Pro Challenge at ITFtennis.com
 Official website

2018 ITF Women's Circuit
2018 in American sports
Tennis tournaments in the United States